Carmen Giese (born 14 March 1965 in Rotenburg an der Fulda) is a West German sport shooter. She competed in rifle shooting events at the 1988 Summer Olympics.

Olympic results

References

1965 births
Living people
ISSF rifle shooters
German female sport shooters
Shooters at the 1988 Summer Olympics
Olympic shooters of West Germany
People from Rotenburg an der Fulda
Sportspeople from Kassel (region)